Maria Giovanna Agresta (born 16 July 1978) is an Italian operatic soprano.

Life 
In 2006 she made her debut in Spoleto as Rosina in Il barbiere di Siviglia and  then appeared as Selene in Baldassare Galuppi's Didone abbandonata. She made her role debut as Micaëla in Carmen in 2007 in Messina and sang Desdemona in Otello in various venues.

Further roles from the Italian repertoire followed; including her role debut as Elena in I vespri siciliani at the Teatro Regio di Torino in 2011, which brought her wide recognition. Since then she has also sung at La Scala in Milan and other important opera houses such as the Teatro dell'Opera di Roma, La Fenice in Venice, the Bayerischen Staatsoper München, the Staatsoper Unter den Linden Berlin, the Semperoper in Dresden, the Royal Opera House London and the Palau de les Arts Reina Sofía Valencia. In 2015 she appeared for the first time at the Salzburg Easter Festivals with Jonas Kaufmann in the role of Nedda in Pagliacci. She made her debut at the Metropolitan Opera (New York) in January 2016 in the role of Mimi in La Bohème. At the Salzburg Festival in August 2016 she made an acclaimed role debut in the French repertoire as Marguerite in Gounod's Faust. In 2017 there followed further engagements at the Metropolitan Opera as Micaëla in Carmen in January and as Liù in Turandot in October. In 2014 Agresta was awarded the XXXIII Premio della Critica Musicale Italiana.

Repertoire 
Roles include:

Her concert repertoire includes also Rossini's Stabat Mater and Verdi's Requiem.

See also 
 Raina Kabaivanska
 Teatro Lirico Sperimentale

Discography

Recordings 
 Galuppi: Didone abbandonata – Piva/Grasso/Giansanti/Agresta/Carnevale/Carè, Welterstaufnahme 2006 Bongiovanni
 Verdi: Sacred Verdi. Quattro pezzi sacri, Libera me, Ave Maria – Maria Agresta, Orchestra e Coro dell’Accademia nazionale di Santa Cecilia / Antonio Pappano. 2014 Warner Classics

Video recording on DVD or Blu-ray Disc 
 Gaetano Donizetti, Gemma di Vergy, Maria Agresta as Gemma. A live recording from the Teatro Donizetti, Bergamo; director: Laurent Gerger. Orchestra del Bergamo Musica Festival Gaetano Donizetti, Roberto Rizzi Brignoli. Published by Bongiovanni, 2011. 
 Giuseppe Verdi, I due Foscari, Maria Agresta as Lucrezia Contarini, Placido Domingo as Francesco Foscari, Francesco Meli as Jacopo Foscari, Orchestra of the Royal Opera House Covent Garden, Antonio Pappano, director: Thaddeus Strassberger. Issued by Opus Arte, 2015.
 Ruggiero Leoncavallo, Pagliacci, Maria Agresta as Nedda, Jonas Kaufmann as Canio, Staatskapelle Dresden, Christian Thielemann. A production of the Salzburg Easter Festival 2015; director: Philipp Stölzl. Published by Sony, 2015. (also with Pietro Mascagni, Cavalleria rusticana.)
 Giacomo Puccini, Turandot, Maria Agresta as Liù, La Scala, Riccardo Chailly. Published by Decca, Jan. 2017.
 Charles Gounod, Faust, Maria Agresta as Marguerite, Pjotr Beczala as Faust, Ildar Abdrazakov as Mephisto. Salzburger Festspiele 2016, Philharmonischer Chor Wien, Vienna Philharmonic under Alejo Perez, director: Reinhard von der Thannen. Published by EuroArts, July 2017.

References

External links 
 Maria Agresta Homepage
 Scheda su sito gmartandmusic.com
 Maria Agresta on Discogs
 Maria Agresta on Paris Opera website
 Maria Agresta on ResMusica
 Mais qui est donc Maria Agresta ? on Forum Opera
 J.Kaufmann & M.Agresta⭐Brevi estratti dal concerto alla Reggia di Caserta (YouTube)

1978 births
Living people
People from the Province of Salerno
Italian operatic sopranos
21st-century Italian women opera singers